Struum (stylized as struum) is an online streaming platform  headquartered in Los Angeles, California. The service focuses on leveraging a credit-based subscription model that combines the content libraries from over 25 different streaming services.

Based on the ClassPass model, which allows subscribers to use the facilities of any member health club, the service essentially acts as an aggregator for various small specialty video-on-demand streaming applications, allowing subscribers to use monthly credits to view content from any of the participating services rather than having to individually subscribe to each app.

Its preview product was first launched in the United States on May 25, 2021, on various devices, including iOS mobile/tablet, web browsers, and Chromecast. Support is also being added for Android devices, Roku, Amazon Fire TV and Apple TV.

History
Struum was founded in April 2020 by former Disney & Discovery executives Lauren DeVillier, Eugene Liew, Paul Pastor, and Thomas Wadsworth.

After its founding, the platform was built with support of Firstlight Media with an array of cloud-native technologies that allow it to aggregate content from more than 50 providers. Its board grew to include Michael Eisner, former CEO of Disney, and Nancy Tellem, former president of CBS.
 
The preview product officially launched in May 2021 via the iOS app store at a subscription price of $4.99 per month for 50 credits.

The service is slated to expand into Canada in 2022, in partnership with Corus Entertainment. It was announced in 2022 that Filmhub will be partnering with Struum.

Content
As of May 2021, Struum has deals in place for over 50 content providers, over 25 of which are currently available within the platform:

 Tastemade
 Tribeca
 Cheddar News
 Kocowa
 Dekkoo
 Magellan TV
 History Hit
 Gusto
 Young Hollywood
 Indieflix
 Filmbox
 Echoboom Sports
 Social Club TV
 Cinedigm
 Magnolia Pictures
 Little Dot Studios
 Group 9
 Stingray Music
 Filmhub
 BBC Select
 REVOLT
 France Channels
 InsightTV
 Docubay
 FuelTV
 The Great Courses Signature Collection
 Shout! Factory
 OUTtv
 SVTV
 CGOOD TV
 Alchimie

References

External links 
 

Subscription video on demand services
Internet television streaming services
Internet properties established in 2021